Ferenc Kocsis (born 8 July 1953) is a retired welterweight Greco-Roman wrestler from Hungary. He won an Olympic gold medal in 1980, a world title in 1979, and European titles in 1978, 1979, 1981 and 1983.

References

1953 births
Living people
Olympic wrestlers of Hungary
Wrestlers at the 1980 Summer Olympics
Hungarian male sport wrestlers
Olympic gold medalists for Hungary
Olympic medalists in wrestling
Medalists at the 1980 Summer Olympics
European Wrestling Championships medalists
World Wrestling Championships medalists
Sport wrestlers from Budapest